Shannon Hope (born November 25, 1962) is a Canadian retired professional ice hockey defender who played for the Peterborough Pirates and the Cardiff Devils as well as for the Great Britain national team, for whom he was the captain between 1995 and 1997. He was inducted into the British Ice Hockey Hall of Fame in 1999.

Hope was born in Peterborough, Ontario.

After retiring from playing, Hope started his own ice hockey clothing business, Shinedog. Hope rejoined the Devils organisation as Director of Hockey in 2008 when the team was bought by Comms Direct owner Matt Burge and continues to work towards re-establishing the 'Next Generation Devils' brand within Wales and the UK.

Awards and honours
BHL Division 1 All-star in 1989.
BHL Premier Division All-star in 1990 and 1991.
Awarded testimonial match by Cardiff Devils on 25 November 1997.
Inducted to the British Ice Hockey Hall of Fame in 1999.
Jersey number 35 retired by Cardiff Devils.

Career statistics

Club

International

Footnotes

References
A to Z Encyclopaedia of Ice Hockey
European Hockey.Net
Ice Hockey Journalists UK
The Internet Hockey Database

External links

1962 births
British Ice Hockey Hall of Fame inductees
Canadian ice hockey defencemen
Canadian emigrants to Wales
Cardiff Devils players
Ice hockey people from Ontario
Living people
Sportspeople from Peterborough, Ontario
Canadian expatriate ice hockey players in England
Canadian expatriate ice hockey players in Wales
Naturalised citizens of the United Kingdom